Austromarrella is an extinct genus of marrellomorph arthropod known from the Middle Cambrian (late Templetonian to early Floran) of Australia.

References

Fossil taxa described in 2012
Marrellomorpha